Frances M. Beal, also known as Fran Beal, (born January 13, 1940, in Binghamton, New York) is a Black feminist and a peace and justice political activist. Her focus has predominantly been regarding women's rights, racial justice, anti-war and peace work, as well as international solidarity. Beal was a founding member of the SNCC Black Women's Liberation Committee, which later evolved into the Third World Women's Alliance. She is most widely known for her publication, “Double Jeopardy: To Be Black and Female", which theorizes the intersection of oppression between race, class, and gender. Beal currently lives in Oakland, California.

Early life 
Beal was born in Binghamton, NY, to Charlotte Berman Yates and Ernest Yates. Her mother's Russian-Jewish immigrant background and father's African-American and Native-American ancestry, along with their experiences with antisemitism and racism, inspired her later work as an activist.

Beal describes her upbringing as difficult, but acknowledges its impact on shaping her political consciousness. As a child, she negotiated her parents' controversial political activism with the need to belong. In an interview she confesses: "I can remember as a child being embarrassed. Why does my mother have to do this?”, stating "you don’t want your parents to be different from everybody else; on another level, you’re learning about injustice." Her mother taught her that she had a personal and political social responsibility to confront inequalities that she and others are subjected to. Having a background with progressive parents introduced her to the injustices in the world. She ultimately harnessed her feelings of displacement into trying to be the best at everything, transforming her discomfort into political activism, following after her parents.

After her father's death, she moved to St. Albans, an integrated neighborhood in Queens.

During her junior year, Beal went abroad to France where she married James Beal and had two children. Beal and her husband lived in France from 1959 to 1966 as she attended the Sorbonne. After six years of marriage, they returned to the states and dissolved their union. Beal became aware of the fight to end the colonial domination in Algeria while studying abroad at the University of Sorbonne, which sparked her political consciousness and interest in social justice.

Political organizing 
In 1958 she began work in political activism with the NAACP where she ran into conservative restrictions that discouraged her from American politics.

Beal formally reengaged with political organizing by joining the SNCC during the Civil Rights Movement. She actively worked to empower Black women through her political involvement in organizations and positions held on committees. In 1969 Beal composed an essay that addressed the complex relations black women were facing in their collective black struggle, called "Double Jeopardy: To Be Black and Female".[4] This document became the SNCC's official stance on women. This publication was a part of a history of black feminist organizing, where her work “coincided with other essays exploring the intersections of race and gender in black women's lives, and more specifically, the political agency of African American women".

During her time there, SNCC activities shifted toward a male-dominated Black Power, moving away from  “sustained community organizing toward Black Power propagandizing that was accompanied by increasing male dominance”. Beal and her female colleagues worked in and contributed to the organization but were not recognized for leadership positions, while patriarchy influenced SNCC's organizing, race singularly became the primary issue that was addressed. Compounded with her concerns over women's rights, Beal became involved with the Women's Movement. Due to women's inferior positions within male-dominated organizations like the SNCC, she co-founded the Black Women's Liberation Committee of SNCC in 1968, which evolved into the Third World Women's Alliance. Looking back, Beal aired her grievances in the film She’s Beautiful When She’s Angry, stating,

“I was in the Student Nonviolent Coordinating Committee. You’re talking about liberation and freedom half the night on the racial side, and then all of a sudden men are going to turn around and start talking about putting you in your place. So in 1968 we founded the SNCC Black Women’s Liberation Committee to take up some of these issues.”

The Black Women's Liberation Committee of SNCC shifted into the Black Women's Alliance, and eventually evolved into the Third World Women's Alliance in 1969. The TWWA is an organization committed to helping marginalized women and communities globally in the struggle for social justice. This organization's fundamental belief recognizes the core stance of intersectionality politics, in which it insists on confronting issues of race and class that affect women of color and poor women uniquely, therefore challenging the idea of a universal womanhood in the process.

While working in the SNCC, Beal and her female colleagues became increasingly concerned about female issues, specifically assault on Black women's reproductive justice through forced sterilization, which motivated her to become a voice for Black women's liberation. She was actively involved in CESA, the Committee to End Sterilization Abuse. This organization fought to help poor women of color who were being disproportionately targeted and coerced into involuntary sterilization get reproductive justice.

She was also a member of the National Anti-Racist Organizing Committee, which focused on anti-racist politics and centered around national organizing.

Through her organizing, Beal confronted a range of oppressive regimes that encompassed complex power relations which subordinated and disenfranchised Black women in particular. Her political organizing sought to address structural inequalities and empower marginalized groups.

Journalism 
Aside from her involvement in organizations, Beal maintained a career as a writer and editor. She was an associate editor of The Black Scholar and reported for the San Francisco Bay View. Beal also was an editor of the TWWA's newspaper, Triple Jeopardy, The Black Woman’s Voice for the National Council of Negro Women, and a contributing editor to the Line of March, a Marxist-Leninist Theoretical Journal.

Publications 
Beal wrote an essay called "Slave of A Slave No More: Black Women in Struggle". Her essay was published in 1975 and appears in the 6th issue of The Black Scholar. This essay addressed chauvinist attitudes of Black men that were predominant during the Civil Rights era. She argues that Black women have been subjected to additive exploitation and oppression because their black brothers maintain gendered ideologies in what should be a collective fight for social justice.

In 1969 she published "Black Women's Manifesto; Double Jeopardy: To Be Black and Female". She describes the nature of African-American women's unique oppression within sexist and racist orders and prescribes Black women's agency. That pamphlet was later revised and then published in The Black Woman, an anthology edited by Toni Cade Bambara in 1970. A revised version of "Double Jeopardy: To Be Black and Female" also appears in the 1970 anthology Sisterhood is Powerful: An Anthology of Writings From The Women's Liberation Movement, edited by Robin Morgan.  It was featured in The Black Scholar in 1975.

In 2002, Beal wrote an article called “Frederick Douglass’ Legacy for Our Times”, in which she names the erasure of imperialist struggles that go overlooked on Independence Day and draws from Fredrick Douglass to remind people "Freedom is a constant struggle."

Beal is featured in the 2013 historical documentary Feminist: Stories from Women's Liberation.

Most recently, in 2014, Beal was featured in the feminist history film She's Beautiful When She's Angry.[7][8]

References

Further reading

External links

Author's Twitter
Facebook
NYTimes
Street Spirit
"Interview with the legendary Frances M. Beal, a pioneer of the Black Women’s Liberation", Hot Indie NEws, March 31, 2009
Interview Frances Beal
Film Excerpt on Youtube

1940 births
Living people
American feminists
African-American feminists
American civil rights activists
African-American women writers
People from St. Albans, Queens
African-American writers
21st-century African-American people
21st-century African-American women
20th-century African-American people
20th-century African-American women